Cinchona can refer to

 Cinchona, a genus in the Rubiaceae plant family
 Jesuit's bark, also called cinchona: bark from any of several Cinchona species used to extract quinine used in medicine
 Cinchona, Costa Rica, epicenter of the 2009 Costa Rica earthquake
 USS Cinchona (AN-12), a World War II-era ship

See also
 Chinchón (disambiguation)